The 174th New York State Legislature, consisting of the New York State Senate and the New York State Assembly, met from January 9, 1963, to December 30, 1964, during the fifth and sixth years of Nelson Rockefeller's governorship, in Albany.

Background
Under the provisions of the New York Constitution of 1938, re-apportioned in 1953, 58 Senators and 150 assemblymen were elected in single-seat districts for two-year terms. The senatorial districts consisted either of one or more entire counties; or a contiguous area within a single county. The counties which were divided into more than one senatorial district were Kings (nine districts), New York (six),  Queens (five), Bronx (four), Erie (three), Nassau (three), Westchester (three), Monroe (two) and Onondaga (two). The Assembly districts consisted either of a single entire county (except Hamilton Co.), or of contiguous area within one county.

At this time there were two major political parties: the Republican Party and the Democratic Party. The Liberal Party, the Conservative Party, the Socialist Workers Party and the Socialist Labor Party also nominated tickets.

Elections
The 1962 New York state election, was held on November 6. Governor Nelson Rockefeller and Lieutenant Governor Malcolm Wilson were re-elected, both Republicans. The other four statewide elective offices were carried by two Republicans; and two Democrats with Liberal endorsement. The approximate party strength at this election, as expressed by the vote for Governor and Lieutenant Governor, was: Republicans 3,082,000; Democrats 2,310,000; Liberals 243,000; Conservatives 142,000; Socialist Workers 20,000; and Socialist Labor 10,000.

Two of the four women members of the previous legislature—Assemblywomen Dorothy Bell Lawrence (Rep.), a former school teacher of Manhattan; and Aileen B. Ryan (Dem.), a former school teacher of the Bronx—were re-elected. Constance E. Cook (Rep.), a lawyer of Ithaca, was also elected to the Assembly.

The New York state election, 1963, was held on November 5. The only statewide elective office up for election was a seat on the New York Court of Appeals. Democrat Francis Bergan was elected with Republican and Liberal endorsement. One vacancy in the State Senate, and two vacancies in the Assembly, were filled.

On February 4, 1964, Constance Baker Motley, a lawyer of Manhattan, was elected to the State Senate, to fill a vacancy.

Sessions
The Legislature met for the first regular session (the 186th) at the State Capitol in Albany on January 9, 1963; and adjourned on April 6.

Joseph F. Carlino (Rep.) was re-elected Speaker.

Walter J. Mahoney (Rep.) was re-elected Temporary President of the State Senate.

The Legislature met for the second regular session (the 187th) at the State Capitol in Albany on January 8, 1964; and adjourned on March 27.

The Legislature met for a special session at the State Capitol in Albany on April 15, 1964; and adjourned on the next day. This session was called to revise the liquor laws.

In 1964, the U.S. Supreme Court handed down several decisions establishing that State legislatures should follow the One man, one vote rule to apportion their election districts. A special Federal Statutory Court declared the New York apportionment formulae for both the State Senate and the State Assembly unconstitutional, and the State Legislature was ordered to re-apportion the seats by April 1, 1965. The court also ruled that the 1964 legislative election should be held under the 1954 apportionment, but those elected could serve only for one year (in 1965), and an election under the new apportionment should be held in November 1965. Senators John H. Hughes and Lawrence M. Rulison (both Rep.) questioned the authority of the federal court to shorten the term of the 1964 electees, alleging excessive costs for the additional election in an off-year.

At the New York state election, 1964, on November 3, Democratic majorities were elected to both the State Senate and the State Assembly for the session of 1965.

The lame-duck Legislature met for another special session at the State Capitol in Albany on December 15, 1964; and adjourned on December 30. This session was called to re-apportion the legislative districts for the 1965 election, gerrymandering the districts according to the wishes of the Republican majority before the Democrats would take over the Legislature in January. The number of seats in the State Senate was increased to 65, and the number of seats in the Assembly to 165. County representation was abandoned in favor of population-proportional districts, and the new Assembly districts were numbered from 1 to 165.

State Senate

Districts

Senators
The asterisk (*) denotes members of the previous Legislature who continued in office as members of this Legislature. Guy James Mangano, Edward S. Lentol and Jeremiah J. Moriarty changed from the Assembly to the Senate at the beginning of this Legislature. Assemblyman Irwin R. Brownstein was elected to fill a vacancy in the Senate.

Note: For brevity, the chairmanships omit the words "...the Committee on (the)..."

Employees
 Secretary: Albert J. Abrams
 Deputy Secretary: Fred Forbes

State Assembly

Assemblymen
The asterisk (*) denotes members of the previous Legislature who continued in office as members of this Legislature.

Note: For brevity, the chairmanships omit the words "...the Committee on (the)..."

Employees
 Clerk: Ansley B. Borkowski
 Sergeant-at-Arms: Raymond J. Roche
 Deputy Journal Clerk: Maude E. Ten Eyck

Notes

Sources
 State Senate In a Nutshell in the Evening Recorder, of Amsterdam, on November 7, 1962 (pg. 2)
 New Lineup for New York State Assembly in the Evening Recorder, of Amsterdam, on November 7, 1962 (pg. 5)
 Capitol Hill Changes: New Faces for '65 in The Knickerbocker News, of Albany, on March 2, 1964
 Members of the New York Senate (1960s) at Political Graveyard
 Members of the New York Assembly (1960s) at Political Graveyard

174
1963 in New York (state)
1964 in New York (state)
1963 U.S. legislative sessions
1964 U.S. legislative sessions